Aswamedham may refer to:
 Aswamedham (TV series), a quiz program
 Aswamedham (film), a 1992 Telugu-language action film

See also
 Ashvamedha, a horse sacrifice ritual
 Ashwamedham, a 1967 Indian Malayalam-language film